Gu Yan (born 17 March 1974) is a retired Chinese race walker.

Achievements

External links

1974 births
Living people
Chinese female racewalkers
Athletes (track and field) at the 1996 Summer Olympics
Olympic athletes of China
Asian Games medalists in athletics (track and field)
Asian Games silver medalists for China
Medalists at the 1994 Asian Games
Athletes (track and field) at the 1994 Asian Games